Dale Laughton (born 10 October 1970) is a former professional rugby league footballer who played in the 1990s and 2000s.

Laughton played  in Sheffield Eagles' 17–8 victory over Wigan in the 1998 Challenge Cup Final during Super League III at Wembley Stadium, London on Saturday 2 May 1998. That year he was named in the Super League Dream Team. Laughton was selected to travel with the Great Britain team down under for the 1999 Tri-Nations. He later played for the Scotland national team international and played at the 2000 World Cup.

References

External links
!Great Britain Statistics at englandrl.co.uk (statistics currently missing due to not having appeared for both Great Britain, and England)
(archived by web.archive.org) The Teams: Scotland
Warrington to part with Busby and Laughton

1970 births
Living people
English rugby league players
Great Britain national rugby league team players
Huddersfield Giants players
Rugby league players from Barnsley
Rugby league props
Scotland national rugby league team players
Sheffield Eagles (1984) players
Warrington Wolves players